Luke Thomas Turley (born 24 March 2000) is an English international swimmer. He has represented England at the Commonwealth Games.

Biography
Turley educated at the University of Bath began his swimming career at the Stevenage Swimming Club before joining the Hatfield Swimming Club. He won double silver behind Daniel Jervis in the 400m and 800m freestyle events at the 2022 British Swimming Championships.

In 2022, he was selected for the 2022 Commonwealth Games in Birmingham where he competed in the men's 400 metre freestyle, finishing in 5th place and the men's 1500 metre freestyle.

References

2000 births
Living people
English male swimmers
British male swimmers
Swimmers at the 2022 Commonwealth Games
Commonwealth Games medallists in swimming
Commonwealth Games bronze medallists for England
21st-century English people
Medallists at the 2022 Commonwealth Games